The Formula Winter Series is a motor racing championship for open wheel, formula racing cars regulated according to FIA Formula 4 regulations, based in Spain. The series is organised by Gedlich Racing with the approval of the RFEDA.

Cars
The cars used in this series are Formula 4 cars with Tatuus Gen 2 chassis powered by an Abarth engine.

Circuits
Bold denotes a Formula One circuit that is currently on the calendar.

References

External links
  

Formula 4 series
Motorsport competitions in Spain
Recurring sporting events established in 2023